The Grand Rapids Baseball Club was a minor league baseball team based in Grand Rapids, Michigan, USA that played under several different names at various times between 1883 and 1951. They played mostly in the Central League but also in various other Michigan-based leagues.

After a long minor league hiatus in Grand Rapids, the West Michigan Whitecaps of the Midwest League began play in Comstock Park, Michigan, just outside Grand Rapids, in 1994.

The Ballparks
Early Grand Rapids teams played at Recreation Park for weekdays games and at Alger Park on Reeds Lake for the weekends. Later, the teams played at Bigelow Field on South Division Avenue.

Bigelow Field was located at 3873 Division Avenue South Grand Rapids, MI 49548. A fast food restaurant occupies a portion of the site today.

Notable alumni

Baseball Hall of Fame alumni
 Burleigh Grimes (1940, MGR) Inducted, 1964
 Rube Waddell (1899) Inducted, 1946
 Sam Crawford (1899) Inducted, 1957

Notable alumni
 Nick Altrock (1899)
 Theodore Breitenstein (1891) ERA Leader

 Hal Carlson (1915)
 Bud Clancy (1923)
 Josh Devore (1920-1921, 1923-1924)
 Red Donahue (1895)
 Red Dooin (1899)
 Pat Duncan (1916)
 Pretzels Getzien (1883-1884)
 Charlie Hemphill (1899)
 Joe Heving (1924)
 Dave Hoskins (1948)
 Bert Humphries (1909)
 Frank Killen (1901)
 Bobby Lowe (1908)
 Jeff Pfeffer (1913)
 Dusty Rhodes (1950)
 Lance Richbourg (1920)
 Milt Shoffner (1926)
 Sherry Smith (1913)
 Ed Summers (1906)
 Lee Tannehill (1917)
 Jack Taylor (1909) ERA Leader
 Maurice Van Robays (1934)
 Stan Wasiak (1941)
 Al Wickland (1911)

References

External links
Baseball Reference

Defunct minor league baseball teams
Brooklyn Dodgers minor league affiliates
Chicago Cubs minor league affiliates
Detroit Tigers minor league affiliates
Defunct baseball teams in Michigan
1883 establishments in Michigan
1951 disestablishments in Michigan
Baseball teams established in 1883
Sports clubs disestablished in 1951
Baseball teams disestablished in 1951